Kristián Kolář (born June 30, 2000) is a Czech professional ice hockey goaltender for HC Plzeň of the Czech Extraliga.

Kolář began his career with IHC Písek at U16 level before joining HC Plzeň in 2016. He made his Extraliga debut with Plzeň during the 2019–20 season where he played two games.

References

External links

2000 births
Living people
Czech ice hockey goaltenders
Sportspeople from Písek
HC Plzeň players
HC Tábor players